Pablo Andújar and Flavio Cipolla were the defending champions but decided not to participate.
Treat Conrad Huey and Simone Vagnozzi won the final against Alessio di Mauro and Alessandro Motti 6–1, 6–2.

Seeds

Draw

Draw

External links
 Main draw

2011 Doubles
Meknes,Doubles